Edward Kenneth Knox (born August 15, 1956) is an American professional golfer who has played on the PGA Tour, Nationwide Tour, and the Champions Tour.

Knox was born in Columbus, Georgia. He and his brother were introduced to the game of golf by their mother. He attended Florida State University in Tallahassee, Florida where he earned All-American honors as a member of the golf team. He graduated in 1978, turned professional that year, and joined the PGA Tour in 1982.

Knox won three events during his career on the PGA Tour. His first win came at the 1986 Honda Classic. He was the first Monday qualifier to win on the PGA Tour and is the only player to win with a round of 80. His second win occurred a year later at the Hardee's Golf Classic and his third came in 1990 at the Buick Southern Open. During this phase of his career, Knox had more than two dozen top-10 finishes and $1.6 million in earnings.  His best result in a major was a 4th-place finish at the 1991 PGA Championship. In his forties, he had difficulty maintaining his PGA Tour privileges and had to play some on the Nationwide Tour.

Knox played on the Champions Tour in 2007 and 2008, managing only two top-25 finishes.

Knox is known for his superior putting ability. He once held the PGA Tour record for fewest putts in a tournament (93) set at the 1989 MCI Classic. His weakness is in the tee-to-green ball-striking phase of the game. In 1996, Knox used his understanding of the short game to start TourGreens, an Atlanta-based business that designs and installs tour-quality artificial putting greens. He is also active in golf course design and construction. He lives in Tallahassee.

Amateur wins
1977 Southeastern Amateur

Professional wins (3)

PGA Tour wins (3)

PGA Tour playoff record (1–1)

Results in major championships

CUT = missed the half-way cut
"T" = tied

See also
Fall 1981 PGA Tour Qualifying School graduates
1983 PGA Tour Qualifying School graduates
1984 PGA Tour Qualifying School graduates

References

External links 

TourGreens site

American male golfers
Florida State Seminoles men's golfers
PGA Tour golfers
PGA Tour Champions golfers
Golfers from Georgia (U.S. state)
Golfers from Tallahassee, Florida
Sportspeople from Columbus, Georgia
1956 births
Living people